The Shawnee State Bears are the athletic teams that represent Shawnee State University, located in Portsmouth, Ohio, in intercollegiate sports as a member of the National Association of Intercollegiate Athletics (NAIA), primarily competing in the Mid-South Conference (MSC) since the 2010–11 academic year. The Bears previously competed in the defunct American Mideast Conference (AMC) from 1991–92 to 2009–10; and as an NAIA Independent from 1986–87 (when the school began its athletics program and joined the NAIA) to 1990–91.

Overview 
The Shawnee State athletics program was established in 1986. The Bears have participated in 25 national championships and 17 conference championships in 7 of 11 sponsored sports.

Accomplishments 
The SSU women’s basketball team won the NAIA Division II National Championship on March 16, 1999 with an 80-65 win over the University of Saint Francis (Indiana).

The SSU men's basketball team won the NAIA National Championship on March 23, 2021 with an 74-68 win over the Lewis-Clark State College.

Varsity teams 
Shawnee State competes in 13 intercollegiate varsity sports: Men's sports include baseball, basketball, cross country, golf, soccer and track & field (outdoor); while women's sports include basketball, cross country, soccer, softball, tennis, track & field (outdoor) and volleyball. Former sports included men's tennis.

Championships 
NAIA National Championships:

Other athletic highlights 
 1992 - softball team finishes 10th in NAIA National Tournament
 1995 - softball team finishes 8th in NAIA National Tournament
 1995 - women's basketball, NAIA National Tournament Final Four
 1996 - softball team finishes as NAIA National Tournament Runners-up
 1998 - softball team finishes 9th in NAIA National Tournament
 1999 - women's basketball team won the NAIA Division II National Championship
 2001 - softball team finishes 9th in NAIA National Tournament:
 2008 - men's cross country team finishes 11th in NAIA National Championships:
 2008 - women's cross country team finishes 13th in NAIA National Championships:
2021 - men's basketball team won the NAIA National Championship

References

External links
 Official website

Mid-South Conference teams
National Association of Intercollegiate Athletics teams
Shawnee State University